Nic Demski (born December 14, 1993) is a Canadian football slotback for the Winnipeg Blue Bombers of the Canadian Football League (CFL). Demski won the 107th and 108th Grey Cups with his hometown Blue Bombers, both times defeating the Hamilton Tiger-Cats.

Junior career
Demski started playing football at the young age of seven with the Charleswood Broncos as a runningback. He then started playing football for the Oak Park Raiders where he played QB in grade 10 before moving to runningback and slotback. In his final high school year he was the MVP of the championship game which the Raiders won, was named the league's offensive player of the year and an all-star for the Winnipeg High School Football League.

Following his secondary school years Demski joined the University of Manitoba Bisons where he was named a CIS All-Canadian and Canada West All-Star in each of his four seasons with the team. Demski was the first Bison to be named to four CIS All-Star teams. He finished his career with  the Bisons ranked fourth in total touchdowns (21), seventh in receiving yards (1,577), fifth in kickoff-return yards (899) and fifth in punt-return yards (941).

Professional career

Saskatchewan Roughriders
Demski was considered a top prospect in the 2015 CFL Draft and was selected by the Saskatchewan Roughriders with the sixth overall pick. He played for the Roughriders from 2015 to 2017. Demski was en route for a breakout season in 2017 before his season was ended by injury with a broken foot in the Labour Day Classic.

Winnipeg Blue Bombers
In 2018 Demski signed a large free agent contract that included a significant signing bonus with his hometown Blue Bombers. Demski had 59 catches for 554 yards and a career high 3 touchdowns throughout the 2018 season. Demski also picked up additional use as a runner, rushing for a career high 248 yards, and his first rushing touchdown on 34 attempts. Winnipeg signed Demski to a new two-year contract several hours into free agency in 2019. In a week 4 game against Ottawa, during the 2019 CFL season, Matt Nichols connected with Demski on an 82 yard TD, the longest of Demski's career. Nichols and Demski hooked up for another catch-and-run TD in the next game, at home against the Argonauts, this time for 67 yards. Demski continue to play a critical role as slot-back receiver for the Blue Bombers. He would help the team upset the Hamilton Tiger-Cats as Winnipeg won the 107th Grey Cup 33-12, ending a 29 year championship drought. Demski was one of a few Winnipeg born players on the team, after the win he said "It's crazy, it's nuts. Just to be on a championship (team) wearing blue. We're able to bring this Cup back home after the drought they had. It feels great. I don’t have any words for it. I'm proud of this team and I'm proud of this organization. I just can't wait to get home to Winnipeg and celebrate with our fans."

After the pandemic cancelled the 2020 CFL season Demski signed a two-year contract extension with the team on January 5, 2021. This allowed him to play a part in the Bomber's title defence season. He helped the Blue Bombers as they finished with the best record in the CFL. When the Bombers hosted their first CFL West Division Final since the 1970s, Demski had 6 catches for 51 yards, helping the team to their second consecutive Grey Cup game. During the 108th Grey Cup, Demski and the team were frustrated by the Hamilton Tiger-Cats and trailed 22-10 late in the fourth quarter. Demski had a catch and cut back from the two defenders at the 15 yard line, scoring the Bombers' first touchdown. The Bombers would force overtime where they would win their second Grey Cup in a row. As a result of Demski's touchdown catch he was named the Grey Cup's Most Valuable Canadian.

Demski suffered an ankle injury early in the 2022 season.

Statistics

References

External links
Winnipeg Blue Bombers bio

1993 births
Living people
Canadian football slotbacks
Manitoba Bisons football players
Players of Canadian football from Manitoba
Saskatchewan Roughriders players
Winnipeg Blue Bombers players
Canadian football people from Winnipeg